Felis chaus affinis is a jungle cat subspecies.
It was described by British zoologist John Edward Gray in 1830 based on an illustration by Thomas Hardwicke.

Taxonomy
Thomas Hardwicke's collection of illustrations of Indian wildlife comprises the first drawing of a Himalayan jungle cat, which the British zoologist John Edward Gray named the "Allied cat" Felis affinis in 1830.

In the 19th century, several jungle cat specimens from India were proposed as subspecies:
In 1832, a stuffed cat was presented at a meeting of the Asiatic Society of Bengal that had been caught in the jungles of Midnapore in West Bengal. Pearson who donated the specimen described it as different in colour from Felis chaus and proposed the name Felis kutas.
In 1852, the Ceylonese naturalist Edward Frederick Kelaart described the first Felis chaus skin from northern Sri Lanka and emphasised its close resemblance to a "swamp lynx".

In the 1930s, Pocock reviewed the Natural History Museum's jungle cat skins and skulls from British India and adjacent countries. Based mainly on differences in fur length and colour he grouped six larger skins from Sind under the name Felis chaus prateri. He subordinated the specimens from Sri Lanka and southern India under Felis chaus kelaarti, but those from northern India and the Himalayas to Felis chaus affinis.

Since 2017, all three names are considered synonymous with F. c. affinis.

References

affinis
Taxa named by John Edward Gray